Svenska Cupen, Svenska Cupen i bandy, is a knockout cup competition in Swedish bandy and the main bandy cup only open for domestic Swedish teams.

The first year was 2005, and was won by Edsbyns IF. The first women's edition was played in 2019, and won by Västerås SK.

Starting for the second year of the cup, a qualification round was made with matches played at different locations around Sweden in January. The real cup was then played at one location in the beginning of or mid-October. Since bandy is a winter sport with a season from autumn to spring, this meant that the qualification games were played in another season than the final cup was played, which could mean that a qualified club could come to the cup with a team consisting of many other players compared to the qualification round, as players are usually traded during the summer. For the 2010 Svenska cupen the qualification round was moved to August–September and the final cup was made smaller, from earlier 16 teams to now 8.

The cup in October has been played in Edsbyn, Västerås, Vänersborg and Linköping in different years.

Cup winners

Men

Women

References

Bandy competitions in Sweden
National bandy cups
Recurring sporting events established in 2005
2005 establishments in Sweden